The Research Double Module was a payload module built by Spacehab Inc (now Astrotech Corporation) for the US Space Shuttle Orbiters.

The Research Double Module flew only on the ill-fated Space Shuttle Columbia STS-107 mission, in which it was destroyed.

Research Double Module

The Spacehab hardware was specifically designed to be nestled inside the cargo bay of the Space Shuttles.

The inaugural flight of Spacehab’s research double module, which launched January 2003 on STS-107, ended when the Space Shuttle Columbia broke up during re-entry. In January 2004, Spacehab filed a formal claim against NASA for the amount of $87.7 million for the loss caused by the Columbia accident. In February 2003 Spacehab received $17.7 million from the proceeds of its commercial insurance policy, and in October 2004 NASA paid the company $8.2 million. In February 2007, Spacehab dropped all litigation against NASA.

Specification

See also
 Spacehab
 Other Spacehab hardware :
 Integrated Cargo Carrier (ICC), unpressurized
 External Stowage Platform (ESP-2 and ESP-3), an ICC variant
 Logistics Single Module (LSM) and Logistics Double Module (LDM)
 Single Module (SM), pressurized
 Spacelab, another reusable laboratory flown in the Shuttle orbiter's cargo bay.

References

Space Shuttle program